During the 1986–87 season, Newcastle United participated in the Football League First Division.

Squad
Squad at end of season

Left club during season

Coaching staff

References

1986-87
Newcastle United